Diken (Ottoman Turkish: Thorn) was a weekly satirical magazine which was published in the period 1918–1920 in Istanbul, Ottoman Empire. It was one of the publications which were founded by Sedat Simavi, a well-known Turkish journalist. The magazine was one of the first Ottoman satirical publications which featured color cartoons.

History and profile
Diken was established by Sedat Simavi in 1918 as a bimonthly magazine. Zekeriya Sertel was another founder of the magazine. Istanbul was under the occupation of Allied forces following World War I when the first issue appeared on 30 October. Over time the frequency of Diken was switched to weekly. The magazine targeted the educated Ottoman intellectuals. Its focus was on the political criticism, and it did not overtly support the independence movement led by Mustafa Kemal Atatürk. It featured poems by Yusuf Ziya Ortaç. After producing 59 issues Diken published its final issue on 19 September 1920.

References

External links

1918 establishments in the Ottoman Empire
1920 disestablishments in the Ottoman Empire
Bi-monthly magazines
Defunct political magazines published in Turkey
Magazines established in 1918
Magazines disestablished in 1920
Magazines published in Istanbul
Satirical magazines published in Turkey
Turkish-language magazines
Weekly magazines published in Turkey
Turkish political satire